Calathus amplior is a species of ground beetle from the Platyninae subfamily that is endemic to the Canary Islands.

References

amplior
Beetles described in 1921
Endemic beetles of the Canary Islands